Hussein Falah Jawad (born July 1, 1994) is an Iraqi professional footballer who currently plays for Al-Minaa in the Iraqi Premier League.

International debut
On August 26, 2015 Hussein Falah made his first international cap with Iraq against Lebanon in a friendly match.

References

External links
 

Iraqi footballers
1994 births
Living people
Iraq international footballers
Basra
People from Basra
Sportspeople from Basra
Al-Mina'a SC players
Association football fullbacks